The fifth season of British science fiction television series Doctor Who began on 2 September 1967 with the first story of season 5 The Tomb of the Cybermen and ended on 1 June 1968 with The Wheel in Space. Only 22 out of 40 episodes are held in the BBC archives; 18 remain missing. As a result, only 2 serials exist entirely. However, The Abominable Snowmen,  The Ice Warriors, The Web of Fear, and Fury from the Deep have had their missing episodes reconstructed using animation.

Casting

Main cast 
 Patrick Troughton as the Second Doctor
 Frazer Hines as Jamie McCrimmon
 Deborah Watling as Victoria Waterfield
 Wendy Padbury as Zoe Heriot 

Patrick Troughton, Frazer Hines and Deborah Watling appear as The Second Doctor, Jamie McCrimmon and Victoria Waterfield respectively. Deborah Watling departs in the penultimate story Fury from the Deep. Wendy Padbury makes her debut as Zoe Heriot in the season finale, The Wheel in Space.

Guest stars
Jack Watling makes his first and last appearances in the series as Professor Edward Travers in the serials The Abominable Snowmen and The Web of Fear. Watling would go on to reprise his role of Travers thirty years on in the spin-off direct-to-video film Downtime.

Michael Kilgarriff makes his first appearance as the Cyber-Controller in The Tomb of the Cybermen. Kilgarriff would reprise the role eighteen years later in Attack of the Cybermen (1985).

The Web of Fear introduced Nicholas Courtney as Colonel Lethbridge-Stewart. He appeared next in the next season's The Invasion, and became a regular supporting character in season 7 – season 13. He made subsequent appearances in season 20 and season 26.

Serials 

Victor Pemberton was script editor for The Tomb of the Cybermen, with Peter Bryant as producer. After this Bryant resumed his role as script editor with Innes Lloyd as producer until The Web of Fear where Bryant took over as producer and Derrick Sherwin replaced Bryant as script editor. The Enemy of the World was the last serial seen under Head of Drama and creator Sydney Newman, who left the BBC after his contract expired in 1967.

Two serials, The Tomb of the Cybermen and The Enemy of the World, are complete in the BBC's archives; these are also the only complete serials from the first two seasons of Patrick Troughton's tenure as the Doctor. The two missing episodes from The Ice Warriors have been recreated in animated form for the DVD release of that story, in a similar fashion to Season 6's The Invasion. The Web of Fear was first released on DVD in 2014 with a Telesnap reconstruction of its missing third episode. On 16 August 2021, a Special Edition DVD/Blu-ray was released in with the missing episode now animated.

Fury from the Deep is the most recent serial that is completely missing, with no episodes in the archives. All other serials in this season are at the very least partially preserved. Fury has also, however, received an animated recreation of all six episodes for a Blu-ray and DVD release. 

The Enemy of the World saw Patrick Troughton playing both the Doctor and the villainous Salamander; this was the first time that the lead actor had played both his regular part and the part of the villain since Season 3's The Massacre of St Bartholomew's Eve.
: Episode is missing

Missing episodes

The Abominable Snowmen – Episodes 1, 3 – 6 (of 6 total) (Animated recreation released in 2022)

The Ice Warriors – Episodes 2 & 3 (of 6 total) (Animated recreations released in 2013)
The Web of Fear – Episode 3 (of 6 total) (Animated recreation released in 2021)
Fury from the Deep – All 6 Episodes (Animated recreations released in 2020)
The Wheel in Space – Episodes 1, 2, 4 & 5 (of 6 total)

Home media

VHS releases

DVD and Blu-ray releases

In print

References

Bibliography 

 
 
 

1967 British television seasons
1968 British television seasons
Season 05
Season 05
5
Black-and-white British television shows